Justice K. A. Parinda Ranasinghe  was a Sri Lankan, judge, who was the 38th Chief Justice of the Supreme Court of Ceylon. He is also the President of the Asia Crime Prevention Foundation.

Educated at Royal College Colombo, Ranasinghe went on to study law at the Colombo Law College passing out as a lawyer. Thereafter he join the judicial service. He was succeeded by Herbert Thambiah.

References

Sinhalese lawyers
Alumni of Royal College, Colombo
Living people
Chief justices of Sri Lanka
Sinhalese judges
Alumni of Sri Lanka Law College
Year of birth missing (living people)